September is a 2007 Australian drama film, directed by Peter Carstairs and produced by John Polson. Set in Western Australia's wheatbelt in 1968 (though filmed at Harden, New South Wales), it stars Xavier Samuel and Clarence John Ryan as two teenagers whose interracial friendship struggles to withstand the expectations of their community. The film sensitively documents the disparity and discrimination faced by the country's Aboriginal people.

Plot
Rick and Eve Anderson are traditional wheat-and-wool farmers in Western Australia's drought-prone wheatbelt. Their 15-year-old son Ed enjoys a close friendship with Paddy, the son of Aboriginal labourer Michael Parker whose family lives in a shack on the farm and receives sustenance provisions in return for their labour. Ed attends school in a nearby township.
 
Paddy receives no schooling but Ed has taught him to read, and he aspires to more in life than his family's virtual slavery. One weekend, on a shopping trip to town, the boys go to the cinema, where the colour bar obliges them to sit in separate rows. They see a newsreel about the Aboriginal boxer Lionel Rose who has won a world championship and is a national hero. The boys build an outdoor boxing ring in a field. As they engage in friendly sparring, Paddy forms the ambition of escaping slavery by joining Jimmy Sharman's fairground boxing troupe.  Their relationship is also tested by Ed's adolescent attraction to a girl, Amelia, whose family has moved to the property next door.

In the previous year (1967), a federal referendum had overwhelmingly determined removal of official discrimination against Aborigines, and given the federal parliament power to make special laws with regard to them. There was simultaneous agitation for other rights, including equal pay for farm workers. However, when Paddy's father enquired whether he could be given wages, his boss Rick Anderson replied that he lacked funds. The Aboriginal family could either continue unpaid or vacate their home on the farm. Michael Parker, whose wife was caring for a new baby, saw no option than to go on working without pay.

The film concludes with Paddy's departure to seek his fortune in boxing, and a reconciliation as Ed apologises for former disloyalty to his friend.

Cast
 Xavier Samuel as Ed Anderson
 Clarence John Ryan as Paddy Parker
 Keiran Darcy-Smith as Rick Anderson
 Kelton Pell as Michael Parker
 Alice McConnell as Eve Anderson
 Lisa Flanagan as Leena Parker
 Mia Wasikowska as Amelia Hamilton
 Sibylla Budd as Miss Gregory
 Anton Tennet as Tom
 Paul Gleeson as John Hamilton
 Tara Morice as Jennifer Hamilton
 Morgan Griffin as Heidi
 Bob Baines as Henry
 Tom E. Lewis as Uncle Harold
 Brady Kitchingham as Tom's mate
 Harry Stewart as Wee Poor Boy
 Bridie-Ann Perry as Towns person

Accolades
Carstairs was the inaugural winner of the Tropfest Feature Program in 2006 for his screenplay for September. The prize included a A$1 million grant funded by The Movie Network, which went toward the film's total budget of $2.4 million.

September premiered at the 2007 Melbourne International Film Festival, and went on to screen at the Toronto and Berlin International Film Festivals of the same year.

In 2008, the film was nominated for the ASSG Feature Film Soundtrack of the Year award. It also won for Jules O'Loughlin the IF Award for Best Cinematography, as well as a nomination for Sam Hobbs (Best Production Design).

References

External links

September At the Movies with Margaret and David
Siddiq Sulaiman Zainal Azhar. September, at Murdoch University Oz Film Database, 2008

Australian drama films
2007 drama films
2007 films
Films scored by Roger Mason (musician)
Films set in Western Australia
2000s English-language films
Films about Aboriginal Australians
English-language drama films